Pain Ganj Afruz (also Romanized as Pā’īn Ganj Afrūz) is a village in Ganjafruz Rural District, in the Central District of Babol County, Mazandaran Province, Iran. At the 2006 census, its population was 4,821, in 1,380 families.

References 

Populated places in Babol County